The Soules Motor Car Company was founded in 1905 in Grand Rapids, Michigan. They were manufacturers of Soules automobiles and light delivery trucks until 1908.

Advertisements

References

Defunct motor vehicle manufacturers of the United States
Brass Era vehicles
1900s cars
Cars introduced in 1906
Motor vehicle manufacturers based in Michigan
Vehicle manufacturing companies established in 1905
Vehicle manufacturing companies disestablished in 1908